Benjamin Totori (born 20 February 1986) is a Solomon Islands footballer who plays as a striker for Kossa.

Club career 
A small but speedy striker, Totori made his name at NZFC side YoungHeart Manawatu before moving to Richmond Athletic and then onto Waitakere United in 2007. In 2008, he moved abroad signing with the Portland Timbers in the United States after impressing New Zealand-born coach Gavin Wilkinson.

Totori returned to Waitakere United after injury cut short his career in the USA. He joined Koloale FC Honiara in October 2010 after another successful spell in New Zealand. He immediately ended up top goalscorer in the Telekom S-league, netting 23 goals in only 19 matches.

On 19 June 2012 it was announced Totori had signed a one-year deal with Hyundai A-League club Wellington Phoenix.

On 14 June 2013, Totori and Wellington Phoenix mutually decided to terminate his contract, allowing him to join the Oakleigh Cannons for the remainder of the 2013 season.

From 2014 until 2017 he played in his homeland for Western United. He played in New Zealand for Three Kings United in the NRFL Premier, for Lautoka from Fiji Premier League, Solomon Warriors, Ba and since July 2020 for Isabel United.

Club Goals

International career 
He made his debut for the Solomon Islands in an August 2007 World Cup qualifying match against American Samoa and has represented his country in several age groups at international level.

At the 2011 Pacific Games, Totori scored a hat trick in the Solomon Islands' opening 7–0 win over Guam.

Totori represented his home side at the 2012 OFC Nations Cup in Honiara, Solomon Islands. In a game against Papua New Guinea Totori scored the lone goal of the match, and then in the final group match against New Zealand Totori scored a goal to tie the match 1–1.

International goals 
Scores and results list Solomon Islands's goal tally first.

Honours

Individual 
2006 Oceania Club Championship Top scorer
2008 OFC Men's Olympic Football Tournament Top scorer

External links 
 
 Player profile – Waitakere United
 2008/2009 stats – NZFC

References 

1986 births
Living people
People from Honiara
Association football forwards
Solomon Islands footballers
Solomon Islands international footballers
Solomon Islands expatriate footballers
Waitakere United players
Portland Timbers (2001–2010) players
Wellington Phoenix FC players
USL First Division players
Expatriate association footballers in New Zealand
Expatriate soccer players in the United States
Solomon Islands expatriate sportspeople in New Zealand
A-League Men players
Solomon Islands expatriate sportspeople in the United States
Oakleigh Cannons FC players
Lautoka F.C. players
New Zealand Football Championship players
2012 OFC Nations Cup players
2016 OFC Nations Cup players